American Higher Education Development Corporation (AHED) is an owner of post-secondary educational institutions including East West College of Natural Medicine in Sarasota, Florida; Madison Media Institute in Madison, Wisconsin; Minneapolis Media Institute in Edina, Minnesota; Rockford Career College in Rockford, Illinois; Stautzenberger College in Maumee, Ohio and Brecksville, Ohio; and The Stautzenberger Institute in Allen Park, Michigan. James M. Devaney founded the company, and Stephen Tave is its current President and Chief Executive Officer.

References

External links

Education companies of the United States
1998 establishments in the United States